Billys Lake is a swamp in the U.S. state of Georgia.

Billys Lake was named after Billy Bowlegs, a leader of the Seminoles.

References

Swamps of Georgia (U.S. state)
Bodies of water of Charlton County, Georgia